Kurt Watzke (3 October 1920 – 16 October 2012) was an Austrian rower. He competed at the 1948 Summer Olympics in London with his brother Gert in the men's coxless pair where they were eliminated in the semi-finals.

References

1920 births
2012 deaths
Austrian male rowers
Olympic rowers of Austria
Rowers at the 1948 Summer Olympics
European Rowing Championships medalists